Dume is a civil parish in northern Portugal.

Dume may also refer to:

Places 
 Dume district, an administrative unit in colonial Cameroon
 Dume River, a waterway in the Democratic Republic of Congo
 Point Dume, a promontory off the coast of California

People 
 Dumè (born 1981), French singer, composer and actor
 Dashnor Dume (born 1963), Albanian footballer and coach
 Herberto Dumé (born 1929), Cuban theatre director
 Margareta Dume (died 1410), Swedish heiress
 Petrit Dume (1920–1975), Albanian general and politician

Fictional 
 Caleb Dume, a Jedi in the Star Wars universe
 ”Dume” (Star Wars Rebels), an episode in the American animated TV series
 Turaga Dume, a character in the Bionicle Lego franchise

See also 
 Dan Dume, a local government area in Katsina State, Nigeria
 Dumes, a commune in the Landes department, Nouvelle-Aquitaine, France